Reinhard Wendemuth (born 1 January 1948) is a former German rower who competed for West Germany in the 1972 and 1976 Summer Olympics.

Wendemuth also won the bronze medal in the coxless four event at the 1974 World Rowing Championships in Lucerne.

References

1948 births
Sportspeople from Braunschweig
Olympic rowers of West Germany
Rowers at the 1972 Summer Olympics
Rowers at the 1976 Summer Olympics
Living people
West German male rowers
World Rowing Championships medalists for West Germany